Muchataga Mugguru is a 1985 Telugu-language comedy film, produced by Yarllagadda Surendra under the S. S. Creations banner, presented by D. Ramanaidu and directed by Relangi Narasimha Rao. It stars Chandra Mohan, Rajendra Prasad, Tulasi, Poornima  and music composed by Chakravarthy. The film was recorded as a Super Hit at the box office.

Plot
Radha (Tulasi) & Vaani (Poornima) are orphan siblings, they live as tenants in the house of a greedy, Linga Rao (Allu Ramalingaiah) one that troubles them for rent. But his wife Seshamma (Nirmalamma) a wise lady is concerned about them. Once, siblings are acquainted with an unemployed youth Rambabu (Chandra Mohan) a newcomer to the city who requires a room at a low cost. So, he shares the portion of the sisters bluffing himself as their maternal uncle's son. The rest of the story is a comic tale of two girls & a boy on a single roof.

Cast
Chandra Mohan as Rambabu
Rajendra Prasad as Ramesh
Tulasi as Radha
Poornima as Vaani
Satyanarayana as Kutumbaiah
Nutan Prasad as Nutan Prasad
Allu Ramalingaiah as Linga Rao
Suthi Veerabhadra Rao as General Manager
Devadas Kanakala as Doctor
Rama Prabha as Rama Devi
Mamatha as Sachu
Nirmalamma as Seshamma

Soundtrack

Music composed by Chakravarthy. Lyrics were written by Veturi. Music released on AVM Audio Company.

References

External links

1980s Telugu-language films
Indian comedy films
Films directed by Relangi Narasimha Rao
Films scored by K. Chakravarthy